Cachoeirinha is a city located in the state of Pernambuco, Brazil. Located  at 169 km away from Recife, capital of the state of Pernambuco.

Geography
 State - Pernambuco
 Region - Agreste Pernambucano
 Boundaries - Tacaimbó   (N);  Lajedo    (S);  São Caitano, Altinho and Ibirajuba    (E);   São Bento do Una    (W).
 Area - 179.27 km2
 Elevation - 536 m
 Hydrography - Una and Ipojuca rivers
 Vegetation - Caatinga Hipoxerófila
 Climate - Semi arid
 Annual average temperature - 21.0 c
 Distance to Recife - 169 km
 Population - 20,501 (2020)

Economy
The main economic activities in Cachoeirinha are based in industry, commerce and agribusiness, especially  beans, corn; and livestock such as cattle, pigs, sheep, goats, horses and poultry.

Economic indicators

Economy by Sector
2006

Health indicators

References

Municipalities in Pernambuco